Matthew Valentine Fleming (born 12 December 1964) is a former British Army officer and professional cricketer who represented Kent County Cricket Club and the England cricket team. He was President of Marylebone Cricket Club (MCC) from 2016 to 2017.

Background and early life
Fleming's great-grandfather was Charles Leslie who played cricket for England and Middlesex in the 1880s. He is also great-nephew of Ian Fleming, popularly known as the creator of James Bond.

Fleming was educated at Eton College, and joined the Royal Green Jackets in 1985 as an officer. He served in Northern Ireland, Hong Kong and Germany.

Cricket career
Fleming captained the British Army cricket team.

Fleming was a professional cricketer from 1989 until 2002. He was a brilliant cover-point fielder, and his first two scoring shots in first-class cricket were sixes.

He played for Kent for 13 years, for whom he scored 9206 runs. He was Kent captain for 4 years. He played 11 One Day Internationals for England, and won the Champions Trophy in Sharjah in 1997.

He was Chairman of the Professional Cricketers Association. In 2016–17, Fleming served as President of the Marylebone Cricket Club.

Later career
Fleming is a partner in Stonehage Fleming, a wealth advisory company.

References

External links

Independent article

1964 births
Living people
Sportspeople from Macclesfield
English cricketers
England One Day International cricketers
Kent cricketers
Kent cricket captains
People educated at St. Aubyns School
Ian Fleming Publications directors
Presidents of the Marylebone Cricket Club
Matthew